Philips is a multinational Dutch electronics corporation.

Philips may also refer to:

 Philips (family) of the Dutch-Jewish electronics corporation
 Philips (surname)
 Philips Classics Records, the classical music division of Philips Records
 Philips Records, a record label founded by the Dutch electronics giant, Philips

See also 
 Phelps (disambiguation)
 Philip (disambiguation)
 Philip's (publisher), a publisher of maps, atlases and reference books in the UK
 Philippe's, a restaurant in Los Angeles
 Phillips (disambiguation)
 Phipps (disambiguation)

Patronymic surnames
English-language surnames
Dutch-language surnames